CASC Rainbow (Cai Hong, abbreviated as CH) is a series of unmanned aerial vehicles (UAVs) developed by the China Academy of Aerospace Aerodynamics, an entity under the China Aerospace Science and Technology Corporation (CASC). The China Academy of Aerospace Aerodynamics is also known as the 11th Academy of CASC, or 701st Research Institute.

Variants

CH-1
CH-1 is the first of the Rainbow (CH) series UAVs. The general designer was Mr. Shi Wen (石文), who is also the general designer of CH-2, the successor of CH-1, CASC PW-1, the derivative of CH-1, and CASC PW-2, the derivative of CH-2. The CH-1 program began in 2000, and its success resulted in the establishment of the UAV program that led to other designs that followed. The CH-1 is mainly intended for reconnaissance and surveillance missions.

Specification:
Wingspan (m): 4.4
Length (m): 3.75
Height (m): 0.87
Weight (kg): 40
Payload (kg): 4.5
Fuel (kg): 26
Max speed (km/h): 170
Cruise speed (km/h): 120 – 150
Normal radius (km): > 100
Normal operating altitude (km): 1 – 3
Ceiling (km): 4.6
Max range (km): 740 @ 1 km altitude and 124 km/h speed
Endurance (h): 6
Rate of climb (m/s): 4.3
Turn radius (m): 290
g overload: - 1.5 to 3
Launch: rocket assisted + catapult mounted on vehicle
Recovery: parachute
Max wind scale allowed for operation: 5

CH-2
CH-2 is the second of the Rainbow (CH) series UAVs and is a development of the earlier CH-1, with identical twin-boom layout.  As for the CH-1, propulsion is provided by a two-blade propeller driven by a pusher engine mounted at the rear end of the fuselage, and the UAV is launched via vehicle mounted catapult with rocketed assisted take-off. The CH-2 is mainly intended for reconnaissance and surveillance missions.

CH-3
CH-3 is a fixed wing unmanned combat aerial vehicle (UCAV) of the Rainbow series. The CH-3 adopts an unusual canard layout, similar to the Jetcruzer 450 and the Rutan VariEze. This means that the CH-3 lacks centrally located vertical tail, but has large winglets and canards.  Propulsion is provided by a three-blade propeller driven by a pusher engine mounted on empennage. The main landing wheels of the tricycle landing gear has fairing to reduce drag.

In January, 2015, a CH-3 drone was reported to have crashed in the north of Nigeria. It is believed the drone was involved in Nigeria's struggle against the militant group, Boko Haram. China supplied the CH-3 to Nigeria government prior to 2014, along with YC-200 guided bombs and AR-1 air-to-ground missile. In February, 2016, Nigeria announced a successful drone strike in its ongoing war against Boko Haram.

China delivered 12 CH-3 to Myanmar in 2014-2015 to fight rebels.
NESCOM Burraq is thought to be mostly influenced by CH-3.

Specification:

Wingspan (m): 8
Range (km): 960
Endurance (h): 12
Payload (kg): 60 – 80
Ceiling (km): 4

CH-3A
CH-3A is the development of CH-3 and share the identical layout. Improvement of CH-3A over CH-3 includes that the maximum payload is increased to more than 100 kg, and satellite data link is also incorporated.
CH3A is a multipurpose UAV which can also carry AR 1 laser guided rocket for attacking role. It is also widely rumoured that Myanmar Air Force operates them, and some images have been found.

Specification:
Payload (kg): 180 maximum
Endurance (h): 6 with maximum payload
Ceiling (Km): 4
Max Range (km): 960

CH-4
Externally, CH-4 looks almost identical to General Atomics MQ-9 Reaper, and the only distinct visual difference between two UAVs is that the ventral fin below the V-tail on MQ-9 is absent on CH-4. There are two versions, the CH-4A and CH-4B. The CH-4A is a reconnaissance drone (capable of a 3500–5000 km range and a 30- to 40-hour endurance) while the CH-4B is a mixed attack and reconnaissance system with provisions for 6 weapons and a payload of up to 250 to 345 kg.

CH-4 is capable of firing air-to-ground missile from altitude of 5,000 meters (~16,400 feet), therefore the aircraft can stay outside of effective range of most anti-aircraft guns. It also allows CH-4 to be able to fire from a position that provides wider viewing area.

Vasiliy Kashin, a China specialist at Moscow's Centre for Analysis of Strategies and Technologies, said that The CH-4B UCAV has been exported to Myanmar, Pakistan, Egypt, Saudi Arabia, Algeria and Iraq. Myanmar is also producing CH-4 UAV under license with the transfer of technology.

Iraq has received an unknown number of CH-4B in early 2015, spurred on battlefield reversals in Mosul and Ramadi to ISIL.

Saqr-1 is thought to be mostly influenced by CH-4.

Specification:
 Length: 
 Wing Span: 
 Max Take Off Weight: 
 Payload: 
 Endurance: 40 hours
 Powerplant: 1 x 1000 Hp engine
 Maximum Speed: 
 Cruise Speed: 
 Communications range: > with SatCom (1,500-2,000 km for CH-4B), ~ from Ground Control Station (GCS)
 Armaments: AR-1 missile, AR-2 missile (20 kg, 5 kg armour-piercing warhead, inertial guidance system with terminal semi-active laser (SAL) seeker, maximum range 8 km), AKD-10 air-to-surface anti-tank missile, BRMI-90 90mm guided rocket, FT-7/130 130 kg glide bombs, FT-9/50 50 kg bomb, FT-10/25 25 kg bomb, GB-7/50 50 kg precision-guided munition (PGM), GB-4/100 PGM.

CH-5
The CH-5 is the latest UCAV of the Rainbow series, with a wingspan of 21 metres, a payload of 1,000 kg, a maximum takeoff weight of over 3 tonnes, a service ceiling of 9 km, an endurance of up to 60 hours and a range of 10,000 km. Thanks to shared data link it can cooperate with CH-3 and CH-4 drones. It conducted its maiden flight in August 2015 and its first airshow flight (in northern Hebei province) in July 2017. The drone can carry 16 missiles at a single time. There were also plans to extend its range up to 20,000 km. Chinese officials claimed the CH-5 Rainbow was similar in performance to the US MQ-9 Reaper and "may come in at less than half the price". Compared to the Garrett TPE331 turboprop engine mounted on the Reaper, CH-5 is equipped with an unidentified turbo-charged piston engine, with less than half the horsepower.  This choice limits the maximum altitude of the CH-5 to 9 km compared to the 12–15 km of the Reaper, but it also extends CH-5's endurance to 60 hours compared to 14 hour of the Reaper's. 

A newer variant with a 300kW piston engine from Anhui Hangrui Co. will increase the service ceiling to 12 km and endurance to 120 hours.

Armaments: AR-1 missile, AR-2 missile (20 kg, 5 kg armour-piercing warhead, inertial guidance system with terminal semi-active laser (SAL) seeker, maximum range 8 km)

CH-6 
The CH-6 is a large UAV with a MTOW of 7800 kg with two variants: a strike variant with 18-hour endurance and 450 kg payload; a reconnaissance variant with 21-hour endurance and 120 kg payload. It was in development in 2021.

CH-7
The CH-7 is a stealthy flying wing UCAV similar to the X-47B, with a 22m wingspan and 10m length. It can fly at 920 km/h and at an altitude of 13,000m. Endurance is about 15 hours and its operational radius is 2000 kilometers. It can carry antiradiation missiles and standoff weapons.  According to its chief designer, "the CH-7 can intercept radar electronic signals, and simultaneously detect, verify and monitor high-value targets, such as hostile command stations, missile launch sites and naval vessels". It is planned to make its maiden flight in 2019 and commence production in 2022.

CH-10
The CH-10 is a tiltrotor UAV.

CH-91
CH-91 is a fixed-wing UAV in twin-boom layout with inverted v-tail and a pair of skids as landing gear.  Propulsion is provided by a two-blade propeller driven by a pusher engine mounted at the rear end of the fuselage. CH-91 is mainly intended for reconnaissance and surveillance missions. It's also called as BZK-008.

CH-92
CH-92 is a fixed-wing UAV in conventional layout with V-tail and tricycle landing gear. Propulsion is provided by a propeller driven by a pusher engine mounted at the empennage. CH-92 is mainly intended for reconnaissance, surveillance and attack missions.

CH-802
CH-802 is a fixed wing micro air vehicle (MAV) in conventional layout with elevated high-wing configuration and V-tail.  CH-802 has a cylindrical fuselage and propulsion is provided by a two-blade propeller driven by a  tractor brushless electric motor atop of the fuselage. CH-803 is mainly intended for reconnaissance and surveillance missions. CH-802 program begun in 2007 and was completed in 2008.

Specification:
Wingspan (m): 3
Length (m): 1.8
Weight (kg): 6.5
Payload (kg): 1
Radius (km): 30
Normal operating altitude (km): 0.3 – 1
Normal radius (km): 30 – 50
Cruise speed (km/h): 60
Endurance (h): 2.5
Ceiling (km): 4
Launch: by hand

CH-803
CH-803 is a fixed-wing UAV with a cylindrical fuselage and canards, but without tailplane. Propulsion is provided by two-blade propeller driven by a  tractor engine mounted in the nose. Another unique feature of CH-803 is that it adopts forward-swept wing. CH-803 is mainly intended for reconnaissance and surveillance missions. CH-803 program begun in 2008 and was completed in 2011.

Specification: 
Wingspan (m): 3
Length (m): 1.8
Weight (kg): 18
Payload (kg): 3.5
Radius (km): 30
Normal operating altitude (km): 0.5 – 1.5
Normal radius (km): 50 – 80
Cruise speed (km/h): 80 – 110
Endurance (h): 5
Ceiling (km): 3.5
Launch: catapult
Recovery: parachute

CH-817
VTOL micro-surveillance and attack UAV with a top speed of 64.8 km/hr and an endurance of 15 minutes.

CH-901
CH-901 is a fixed-wing UAV in conventional layout with cylindrical fuselage and high-wing configuration. Propulsion is provided by a two-blade propeller driven by a pusher engine mounted at the end of empennage. CH-901 is designed as an UCAV.

CH-902
Fixed-wing cylindrical UAV.

Operational history

Royal Saudi Land Force 
The Kingdom of Saudi Arabia have been operating CH-4, along the Wing Loong II drone in its military intervention in Yemen.

On 12 July 2018, Houthi rebels shot down an armed Saudi Arabian CH-4 drone near Asir border.

On 8 August 2018, Houthi rebels shot down an armed Saudi Arabian CH-4B drone near Tuwal border crossing.

On 23 December 2018, Houthi rebels shot down a Saudi Arabian CH-4 drone. in Saada province, northern Yemen and displayed the wreckage of the drone.

On 11 April 2019, a Saudi Arabian CH-4 drone is lost over Yemen, according to Houthi media the Saudi drone was shot down by friendly fire.

On 7 January 2020, Houthi rebels shot down an armed Saudi Arabian a CH-4B drone over Jawf province.

On 22 December 2020, Houthi rebels shot down a Saudi Arabian CH-4B drone, serial number 20311 on the district of Madghal in Marib province.

On 12 February 2021, Houthis intercepted a Saudi Arabian CASC Rainbow CH-4 drone in Meghdal, Marib Governorate, displaying footage of the shot down.

On 23 March 2021, a Houthi spokesman said that Houthi forces shot down a US MQ-9 Reaper drone operating in Marib, however a day later the Houthis published footage of the shootdown depicting a drone resembling a CH-4 drone.

On 23 May 2021, a Saudi Coalition CH-4 drone is shot down by Houthi fighters in Al-Maraziq, Al-Jawf governarate. Later Houthi media wing released a video of the shotdown of the drone.

On 6 October 2021, Houthis reported the shot down of a Saudi Arabian CASC Rainbow CH-4 drone in Juba district, southern Marib province by Houthi Air Defenses, later displaying footage of the drone wreck.

United Arab Emirates Air Force 
The United Arab Emirates Air Force have been operating CH-4, along the Wing Loong II drone in its military intervention in Yemen.

Comparison

Operators

 Algerian People's National Armed Forces: CH-3 and CH-4

 Ethiopian National Defense Force: CH-4

 Indonesian Armed Forces: six CH-4Bs

 Iraqi Armed Forces: 14 CH-4B

 Myanmar Air Force: Acquired 12 CH-3As and some CH-4s for precision airstrike mission. Myanmar is also producing CH-4 with the transfer of technology under license.

 
Nigerian Air Force: CH-3 and CH-4

 Pakistan Armed Forces: Known to use CH-3 inspired UCAVs like the GIDS Shahpar since 2012. Procured 12-24 CH-4A/B UCAVs in late January 2021.

 Serbian Air Force and Air Defence: 6 CH-92A

 
 Turkmen Air Force: 3 3 CH-3

 
 Zambian Defence Force: CH-4
 

 United Arab Emirates Armed Forces: CH-4

See also

References

External links 
 Article detailing the CH family development

Unmanned military aircraft of China
Unmanned stealth aircraft